National Heritage Academies, Inc. (NHA) is a for-profit education management organization headquartered in Grand Rapids, Michigan. As of the 2019-20 school year, NHA operates 88 charter schools in nine states: Michigan, Indiana, Ohio, New York, North Carolina, Colorado, Georgia, Louisiana, and Wisconsin.  NHA is the largest charter school operator in Michigan and one of the largest charter school operators in the United States. NHA schools are prominent among charter institutions for employing the brick and mortar or traditional school concept. It has been accused of profiting from tax-payers money and is in the process of selling over two-thirds of its schools, financed by taxes to a new corporation which will become its real estate arm.

History

NHA was formed in 1995 by entrepreneur J. C. Huizenga.

Operations

In 2015, National Heritage Academies managed charter schools enrolled over 58,000 students on a vendor operated school basis.

NHA managed charter schools are publicly funded and charge no tuition.  They are authorized by state-approved institutions such as universities and school boards, and therefore have no geographic boundaries. The schools focus on college preparedness and generally serve students from kindergarten through eighth grade, with some schools also offering pre-kindergarten.

Unlike most charter school companies in Michigan, NHA purchases the school buildings, including those that were built from public money.

Academics 

According to a 2017 study by the Center for Research on Education Outcomes, students in NHA schools were found to show improved spring-to-spring academic growth in the subjects of reading and math, compared with their traditional public school peers.

NHA schools use the NWEA test as a measure of student performance. The Northwest Evaluation Association has instituted an assessment process for both mathematics and reading. This computerized assessment is administered to provide data on students' growth in the fields of math and reading.

All Schools

Colorado
Foundations Academy
Landmark Academy at Reunion
Mountain View Academy

Georgia
Atlanta Heights Charter School

Indiana
Andrew J. Brown Academy
Aspire Charter Academy

Louisiana
Advantage Charter Academy
Inspire Charter Academy
Willow Charter Academy

Michigan
Achieve Charter Academy
Burton Glen Charter Academy
Canton Charter Academy
Chandler Woods Charter Academy
Cross Creek Charter Academy
Detroit Enterprise Academy
Detroit Merit Charter Academy
Detroit Premier Academy
Eagle Crest Charter Academy
East Arbor Charter Academy
Endeavor Charter Academy
Excel Charter Academy
Flagship Academy
Fortis Academy
Grand River Preparatory High School 
Great Oaks Academy
Hamtramck Academy
Keystone Academy
Knapp Charter Academy
Lansing Charter Academy
Laurus Academy
Legacy Charter Academy
Linden Charter Academy
Metro Charter Academy
North Saginaw Charter Academy
Oakside Scholars Charter Academy
Paragon Charter Academy
Paramount Charter Academy
Pembroke Academy
Plymouth Scholars Charter Academy
Prevail Academy
Quest Charter Academy
Reach Academy
Regent Park Scholars
Ridge Park Charter Academy
River City Scholars
South Arbor Charter Academy
South Canton Scholars Charter Academy
South Pointe Scholars Charter Academy
Taylor Exemplar Academy
Timberland Charter Academy
Triumph Academy
Vanderbilt Charter Academy
Vanguard Charter Academy
Vista Charter Academy
Walker Charter Academy
Walton Charter Academy
Warrendale Charter Academy
Westfield Charter Academy
Wellspring Preparatory High School
Windemere Park Charter Academy

New York
Brooklyn Dreams Charter School
Brooklyn Excelsior Charter School
Brooklyn Scholars Charter School
Buffalo United Charter School
Riverton Street Charter School
Southside Academy Charter School

North Carolina
Forsyth Academy
Gate City Charter Academy
Greensboro Academy
Johnston Charter Academy
Matthews Charter Academy
Peak Charter Academy
Phoenix Academy
PreEminent Charter School
Queens Grant Community School
Research Triangle Charter Academy
Rolesville Charter Academy
Summerfield Charter Academy
Wake Forest Charter Academy***
Winterville Charter Academy
amgus acemy***

Ohio
Alliance Academy of Cincinnati
Apex Academy
Bennett Venture Academy
Emerson Academy
North Dayton School of Discovery
Orion Academy
Pathway School of Discovery
Pinnacle Academy
Stambaugh Charter Academy
Winterfield Venture Academy

Wisconsin
Milwaukee Scholars

Resources
"Excel Charter School Gets Approval For Building," Grand Rapids Press, August 11, 1995, p. A12.
Franklin, Amy, "Federal Court Dismisses Lawsuit Against Charter School," Associated Press Newswires, September 27, 2000.
Golden, Daniel, "Common Prayer: Old-Time Religion Gets a Boost at a Chain of Charter Schools," Wall Street Journal, September 15, 1999, p. A1.
Kirkbride, Ron, "Banking Syndicate Raises $25 Million to Expand National Heritage Schools," Grand Rapids Press, July 12, 2002, p. A6.
Knape, Chris, "National Heritage Remains in Class of Its Own," Grand Rapids Press, August 13, 2003, p. A10.
Molinari, Deanne, "Peter Ruppert: Inside Track," Grand Rapids Business Journal, June 30, 1997, p. 5.
"National Heritage Makes Money Running Charter Schools," Associated Press Newswires, December 2, 2001.
Rent, Katy, "Going to the Head of the Class," Grand Rapids Business Journal, November 19, 2001, p. 3.
Riede, Paul, "State Oks Southside Charter School," Post-Standard (Syracuse), December 21, 2001, p. A1.
Schuetz, Kym, and Roland Wilkerson, "Charter School Sale Would Fund Expansion," Grand Rapids Press, October 9, 1998, p. A1.
Singhania, Lisa, "Companies See Profit in Charter Schools," Associated Press Newswires, April 28, 2000.
Weiker, Jim, "Charter Group Says It Has Funds To Grow," Grand Rapids Press, January 18, 2000, p. B1.
Wyatt, Edward, "Charter School to Raise Topic of Creationism," New York Times, February 18, 2000, p. 1.

References

Charter schools in the United States
Companies based in Grand Rapids, Michigan
Education companies of the United States
Education reform
Education management organizations
Charter management organizations
American companies established in 1995
1995 establishments in Michigan